is a Japanese professional footballer who plays as a midfielder for Fortuna Düsseldorf and the Japan national team.

Club career
Raised for a decade in the Kawasaki Frontale youth ranks of his hometown, Tanaka made his J1 League debut in September 2018 against Consadole Sapporo, scoring his first professional goal just six minutes after he was subbed on. As injuries struck the midfield options of Kawasaki Frontale during the 2019 season, he earned more starts with his club, participating in 24 J1 League matches throughout the season, accumulating 31 matches in total during the year, across 5 different competitions. As his performances continuously caught the eyes of many, and his manager's approval, he was then awarded the 2019 J.League Rookie of the Year Award in his first full professional season. With this feat, he is the only Kawasaki Frontale player ever to win this award.

Throughout the 2020 season, Tanaka established for a good reputation among the Kawasaki Frontale players, playing a total of more than 2500 minutes across all competitions, being a starter in most of the matches he played. His performances with the Kawasaki Frontale team also helped him earn caps with the Japan under-23 team, including a 2-goal performance that helped the Japan under-23s earn a 3–2 win over the Brazil under-23 team in a friendly match at 14 October 2019.

On 26 June 2021, after two and a half professional seasons with Kawasaki Frontale, he joined German 2. Bundesliga side Fortuna Düsseldorf on a year-long loan with an option to buy.

On 28 April 2022,Fortuna Düsseldorf, satisfied with his club and national team performances, exercised the buy-out option in his club contract to acquire him, paying his release clause to get him officially signed for the club on 28 April 2022. He signed a 3-year long contract with the expiration date being 30 June 2025, encouraged by a sequence of game time with their first-team in the 2021–22 2. Bundesliga.

International career
Tanaka made his debut for the Japan national football team on 14 December 2019, in a 5–0 win against Hong Kong in the 2019 EAFF E-1 Football Championship. In the summer of 2021, he was named in the 22-man squad for the 2020 Olympic Games alongside 2 Kawasaki Frontale ex-teammates, Kaoru Mitoma, and Reo Hatate. He started every match for Japan during the tournament.

He played his first match in the AFC qualification tournament for the 2022 FIFA World Cup on 12 October 2021, where he scored his first international goal in a 2–1 home win against Australia. On 1 November 2022, Tanaka was included in Japan's 26-man squad for the 2022 FIFA World Cup. On 1 December, he scored the winning goal in a 2–1 victory over Spain, which qualified his national team to the knockout stage as top of their group.

Personal life 
He is currently dating Airi Suzuki, a former member of the Japanese idol group Cute.

Career statistics

Club

International

International goals

Scores and results list Japan's goal tally first.

Honours
Kawasaki Frontale
J1 League: 2017, 2018, 2020
Emperor's Cup: 2020
J.League Cup: 2019
Japanese Super Cup: 2019, 2021

Individual
J.League Rookie of the Year: 2019
J.League Best XI: 2020
Toulon Tournament Bronze Ball : 2019
Toulon Tournament Best XI: 2019

References

External links
 Ao Tanaka at data.j-league.or.jp 
 Ao Tanaka at www.jleague.jp (archived)  
 Ao Tanaka at Kawasaki Frontale 

1998 births
Living people
Association football people from Kanagawa Prefecture
Japanese footballers
Association football midfielders
J1 League players
2. Bundesliga players
Kawasaki Frontale players
Fortuna Düsseldorf players
Japan international footballers
Footballers at the 2020 Summer Olympics
Olympic footballers of Japan
Japanese expatriate footballers
Expatriate footballers in Germany
Japanese expatriate sportspeople in Germany
2022 FIFA World Cup players